Jambhavan is a 2006 Indian Tamil-language action film directed by A. M. Nandakumar and produced by Rajalakshmi Kalaikudam. The film stars Prashanth, Nila and Meghna Naidu, while Vivek, Vijayan and Vijayakumar play other pivotal roles. Featuring music composed by Bharadwaj, the film released on 8 September 2006 to below average reviews.

Plot
The movie is about Velan, a responsible son of a village landlord. Adored by the villagers for his good deeds, Velan gets a shock when the landlord informs him that he is his foster son. A shocked Velan sets out on a mission to learn about his past. He reaches Chennai and learns that his family members were killed by the dreaded gangster Deva. He then vowed to kill him and his gang. In the name of Jambhavan, he starts to kill rowdies in society. Suffering a head injury, Velan loses his memory and is later adopted by the landlord. He realises that his job was just half-done. The remainder of the movie is how he puts an end to Deva and his men.

Cast
Prashanth as Velan (Jambhavan)
Nila as Ezhil
Meghna Naidu as Anu
Vijayan as Deva
Vijayakumar as Velan's foster father
Vivek as Subhash
Madhan Bob as Doctor
Y. G. Mahendra as CBI officer Ganapathy
T. N. Seshagopalan
Nancy Jennifer
Mayilsamy
Venba as a child artist

Production
The film was announced in December 2005 and began production shortly after a launch event held in Tirupathi. Directed by Nandakumar who earlier directed Vijayakanth starrer Thennavan (2003), it was reported that actor Prashanth would sport three different appearances in the movie and a special make-up man and physical instructors were brought in from Mumbai for the movie. Nila and Meghna Naidu were signed to portray the film's lead heroines, while Carnatic vocalist T. N. Seshagopalan was also selected to play a pivotal role, in his second film. A third leading female role was considered, but later dropped after actresses had refused the offer. The team then began shoot with a thirty-day schedule in Tenkasi in Southern Tamil Nadu.

The making of the film was disrupted in January 2006, when actress Nila walked out of the film after falling out with the producers. It was revealed that for a bathing scene in Courtallam she had asked for the tub to be filled with mineral water and when the team could not satisfy that demand, she had a difference of opinion with the producers. Nila revealed that she was an asthma sufferer and was unable to get into the tub of water that the team had provided. During a press meet in late March 2006, Nila announced that she re-joined the team and shot for scenes in Taramani, Chennai and had put aside her differences after the producers apologised. The team then also went on to film song sequences in Thailand with the lead pair.

Release
The film opened on 8 September 2006 alongside Krishna's Sillunu Oru Kaadhal and Thirumurugan's Emmtan-Magan, and received predominantly negative reviews. A critic from Sify.com noted "this film is a slapdash enterprise that will make you groan", adding "it caters strictly to B and C class audiences and leaves you cold".

Another reviewer noted the similarity to Baashha (1995) adding "the quality of these remakes has ranged from entertaining to outright bad and Prashanth's Jaambavan unfortunately comes in at the lower end of that scale." Indiaglitz.com also noted the similarity adding "director Nandakumar has taken cue from a few 'mass films', but just has not managed to cobble them with any sense of purpose."

Soundtrack

The film score and the soundtrack were composed by Bharadwaj. The soundtrack, released on 2 August 2006, features 7 tracks.

References

External links
 

2006 films
2000s Tamil-language films
Films scored by Bharadwaj (composer)
2000s masala films
Indian action films
Indian films about revenge
Films shot in Chennai
Films shot in Thailand
2006 action films